Decker can refer to:

Names
 Decker (surname)

Places
Antarctica
Decker Glacier
Canada
Decker, Manitoba
Decker Lake (British Columbia), a lake near the town of Burns Lake, British Columbia
Decker Lake, British Columbia, a community on that lake

United States
 Decker, Indiana, a town
 Decker, Wisconsin, an unincorporated community
 Decker Corner, Wisconsin, an unincorporated community
 Decker Peak, a mountain in Idaho
 Decker Prairie, Texas
 Deckertown, New Jersey
 Deckerville, Michigan
 Deckers, Colorado

Entertainment
 Black+Decker, an American manufacturer of power tools, accessories, hardware, home improvement products, home appliances and fastening systems 
 Decker, a term for a computer hacker in the Shadowrun universe
 Decker (TV series), an American comedy web and television series starring Tim Heidecker and Gregg Turkington
 Ultraman Decker, a 2022 Japanese tokusatsu television series

Other
 Double decker bus, a bus which has two decks (floors) for passengers
 Forster–Decker method, a series of chemical reactions that transform a primary amine ultimately to a secondary amine

See also
Deckers (disambiguation)
Dekker